Ericsson or Ericson is a Swedish patronymic surname meaning "son of Eric". Notable people with the surname include:

Anders Ericsson (1947-2020), Swedish psychology professor and researcher, famous for his work on deliberate practice
Bo Ericson (athlete) (1919–1970), Swedish hammer thrower
Devon Ericson, American actress
Eric Ericson (1918–2013), Swedish conductor
Eric Ericson (actor) (born 1974), Swedish actor
George E. Ericson (1902-1980), American farmer and politician
Georg Ericson (1919–2002), Swedish footballer and coach
Gunnar Ericsson (1919–2013), Swedish businessman and politician
Gunvor G. Ericson (born 1960), Swedish politician
Hans-Ola Ericsson (born 1958), composer and organist 
John Ericson (born 1926), German-American actor and film and television star 
John Ericsson (1803–1889), Swedish inventor and mechanical engineer, designer of the USS Monitor 
Jonathan Ericsson (born 1984), Swedish ice hockey player
Jörgen Ericsson (born 1953), Swedish Navy rear admiral
Karolina Ericsson (born 1973), Swedish badminton player
Lars Magnus Ericsson (1846–1926), Swedish inventor and founder of the telecommunications company Ericsson 
Lars-Ivar Ericson (born 1948), Swedish Centre Party politician
Leif Ericson (970–1020), Icelandic explorer, and first European to discover North America
Marcus Ericsson (born 1990), Swedish race car driver
Martin Ericsson (born 1980), Swedish footballer for IF Elfsborg
Nils Ericson (1802–1860), Swedish inventor and mechanical engineer
Norman Ericson (1932–2011), American-Swedish teacher and Bible scholar
Rolf Ericson (1922–1997), Swedish jazz trumpeter
Stig H:son Ericson (1897–1985), Swedish Navy admiral and Marshal of the Realm
Sven-Göran Eriksson (born 1948), Swedish former football manager of England national team
Ulrika Ericsson (born 1970), Swedish Playboy model and actress

See also
Erickson (surname)
Eriksson
Derrickson

Swedish-language surnames
Patronymic surnames
Surnames from given names